La Masó is a municipality in the comarca of Alt Camp, province of Tarragona, Catalonia, Spain.

Activities include an oil refinery.

References

External links
Official website 
 Government data pages 

Municipalities in Alt Camp
Populated places in Alt Camp